, better known simply as Sophitia, is a fictional character in the Soulcalibur series of video games. Created by Namco's Project Soul division, she first appeared in Soul Edge and its subsequent sequels, as well as appearing in various merchandise related to the series.

A baker-turned warrior, Sophitia became involved in the search for the cursed sword, Soul Edge, following the blessings of the god Hephaestus. The affair soon affected her other family members as well, including her sister, Cassandra, and later her children, Pyrrha and Patroklos. The character has received positive reception, often noted for her sexualized portrayal in the series.

Conception and history
As a character introduced in Soul Edge, Sophitia's weaponry, a sword and shield combination designed to be unique amongst the other weapons in the game, were selected before other elements of the character. Her design and concept were then built to revolve around it, starting with gender, then physical measurements, and lastly background details. After her appearance and movement were fleshed out by a concept artist, her character was rendered as a 3D model by a design team that worked solely on her, and then animated by Tomoe Yamashita using motion capture to create her in-game movements. Yamashita, who additionally created the "struck" movements for many other characters in the game, noted particular fondness for Sophitia while designing her.

During her creation, designers focused on maintaining an innocent appearance for her face, to give the character a sense of feeling fresh and young. Freedom of movement between the sword and shield were emphasized, with the intention to allow for the blade to rotate around the shield for cyclonic attacks. An alternate character named , a brunette clad in asymmetrical armor, was conceived during the development of Sophitia's secondary outfit in Soul Edge, but was abandoned. The character concept would later be revisited in Soulcalibur IV, appearing as an ally character in Sophitia's story mode and using her fighting style. While developing Soulcalibur VI, Sophitia and Mitsurugi have been the first characters to be created and then used "as a foundation" for the decisions regarding the other characters' movements, visuals, and so forth.

In video games
A simple baker, Sophitia was ordered by the Greek god Hephaestus to destroy a parasitic living sword, Soul Edge, which had manifested as a pair of twin swords held by undead pirate Cervantes de Leon. Though she destroyed one of the blades, shards from its destruction wounded her, leaving one piece embedded near her heart. After recovering, she led a quiet life until years later she was tasked once more to destroy a restored Soul Edge and its new host, Nightmare. Unable to locate it before its destruction, she returned home to her husband and gave birth to a daughter, Pyrrha, and later a son, Patroklos.

Four years later, her husband received a shard of Soul Edge from a mysterious customer, it caused Sophitia's old wounds to ache, while it caused her children to behave violently. Seeking to destroy the reformed blade. Her journey took her to Ostrheinsburg Castle, where she encountered the evil warrior Tira, who threatened to kidnap her children and sacrifice them to Soul Edge. Due to Tira's machinations, Pyrrha is left in a state where she would not survive if the sword were destroyed, leaving Sophitia forced to protect it for the sake of her daughter. The sword was eventually destroyed, and she removed the fragment near her heart, sacrificing her life in place of her child's.

Sophitia appears as a playable character in the spin-off game Soulcalibur Legends, set between the events of Soul Edge and Soulcalibur. She is also featured as a playable character in Soulcalibur: Broken Destiny, Soulcalibur: Lost Swords, and Soulcalibur: Unbreakable Soul.

Gameplay
Sophitia has always been one of the most fan service oriented characters in the series. The Japanese release of Soul Edge included cheat codes to change the color of Sophitia's underwear (white by default); the cheat was removed in the North American version but returned for Sophitia and also Seong Mi-na in the iOS port of Soulcalibur. In Soul Edge there are also two secret characters named "Sophitia!" (in a more revealing costume) and "Sophitia!!" (wearing a swimsuit). Sophitia has become increasingly larger breasted and skimpier clothed over the course of the series. Her originally sometimes reddish brown hair became purely blond in later games.

According to Computer and Video Games, the key in using Sophitia in Soul Edge is in trickery and her ability to frustrate the human opponent, as she lacks neither the brute strength of Rock nor the extreme speed of Taki. Ultra Game Players' guide to Soul Edge opined that "while she does have the speed, she lacks the variety of attacks of such characters as Taki" and advised not to rely on her combos too much and instead to use her large assortment of kicks and strikes. Electronic Gaming Monthly opined Sophitia in Soulcalibur II "excels at offense and has a wide assortment of juggle combos. She's beginner-friendly, but sometimes predictable." GamePro guide to Soulcalibur II lists her strong points as having good balance of speed and power and being easy to pick up by a novice player, but opined she is hard to master and "can become boring quickly." According to GameSpy, "unlike Cassandra, Sophitia isn't built for the world of Soul Calibur 2, so people may have a hard time winning with her, but it's possible," especially when played offensively like her sister, putting to use her high damage potential, fast foot speed, and poking attacks; her listed weaknesses are weak throw attacks and being relatively easy to evade by sidestepping. Soulcalibur VI producer Motohiro Okubo also recommended her to various types of players, including beginners.

Other appearances
Outside of the Bandai Namco Entertainment property, she made a guest appearance in the Tecmo Koei hack and slash game Warriors Orochi 3 Ultimate. According to that game's story, Sophitia was transported to Orochi's dimensional realm through time distortion during the events of Soulcalibur IV. She meets Masanori Fukushima, Nene, and Sun Jian, who are part of the Coalition and want to recruit her during battle at Liaodong. While Sophitia is in struggle to find a way to go back to her world so she could return to care her children, she decides to put aside her goal and join to provide help for the Coalition.

A Sophitia-themed in-game costume DLC was released for Sony Computer Entertainment's LittleBigPlanet 3. Yujin released a four inch tall immobile figurine of Sophitia as part of their "Namco Girls Series #3" line of figurines for gashapon. Other commercial items bearing Sophitia's likeness include a resin kit designed by Hiroshi Satou for manufacturer Kurushima. A 12-inch collectible statue of her comes with the special edition of Soulcalibur VI.

Reception
The character was very well received by the media and general public alike. Of the latter, she was voted the Soul Edge players' choice in Japan. In a 2002 official poll by Namco prior to the release of Soul Calibur II regarding their favorite character, Sophitia placed second with 18% of the tally, behind Seong Mi-na. In the "Miss of Video Games 2012" poll by Poland's PSX Extreme, Sophitia won in the 'Soul Calibur' category. In 2015, Sophitia was voted the 11th most popular Soulcalibur character in the West in another official poll by Namco Bandai and emerged as the winner of the Round 2 vote in 2016.

Sophitia was chosen as one of the 20 "muses" of video games by Brazilian magazine SuperGamePower in 2001.  In 2003, GameSpy named her one of their top ten women in gaming at number five, stating Sophitia "became one of the most easily recognized characters in the series" and "remains one of Soul Calibers most memorable babes since the days of her swimsuit debut in Soul Blade." In 2007, she was listed by Tom's Games as one of the 50 greatest female characters in video game history, for being "a virtuous heroine who's as brave as she is cute." UGO placed her seventh in the 2008 list of top Soul series characters. That same year, Chip ranked her as the eighth-top "girl of gaming". She was ranked as the sixth top mother character in PlayStation games by PlayStation Revista Oficial - Brasil in 2016.

WomenGamers.com praised her strength as a character in the series, noting "Sophitia is probably one of the most important and pivotal of all the seekers of the twin blades." Additional praise was given to her personality in contrast to more common anti-hero characters, as well as the realism of her fighting style approach, stating that all combined made her role in the game "uniquely positive." Sophitia has also become one of the more popular subject of Soulcalibur fan art.

Sex appeal 
The 2004 book Race, Gender, Media: Considering Diversity Across Audiences, Content, and Producers used Sophitia as an example of most sexualized female characters in video games, describing her body and clothing as being created solely for the viewing pleasure of players, often males, and Leigh Alexander used Sophitia from Soulcalibur IV as a primary illustration of the article "In Defense of Breast Physics". Naming Soul Edge as the fourth top PlayStation game to date in 1997, PlayStation Magazine wrote: "Favorite Moment: Finally figuring how to change the color of Sophitia's undies. Every fighting game should have this as an option." Official Dreamcast Magazine, having her voted by the readers as the second-top "girl on the Dreamcast" in 2000 (third in the magazine's Spanish language edition), commented: "If there's one girl who we wouldn't mind beating us into submission it would have to be the lovely Sophitia. With legs that go up to her armpits, flowing golden hair and looks of a model she truly belongs on the catwalk." Official Xbox Magazine called Sophitia the "Hellenic goddess of our dreams." The character's sexual appeal was emphasised from the very first game in the series where in the intro sequence of the Japanese version she briefly appears topless, though her breasts are not exposed. This scene was censored with clothing in overseas editions.

GameDaily described her appearance as "angelic", adding "despite looking homelier than the other girls, [she] is still jaw dropping," and gave her mentions and praise in several articles for her character strength and evolution along the series. Notably, GameDaily ranked her number five in two different "hottest game babes" lists in 2008. She placed 38th in UGO's 2011 list of top "videogame hotties", called "a force to be reckoned with in the Soul Calibur series," and was listed by UGO's Aubrey Sitterson as one of "fighting games' finest female fighters". Maxim named her as one of the hottest video game females of 2008, calling her "literally, the best thing since sliced bread." In 2011, GameFront ranked her breasts as the "26th-greatest boobs" in video game history, while PSU featured her among the sexiest PlayStation game characters, adding "Somebody say MILF?" Complex ranked her as the sixth-best-looking "sideline chick" in 2011, further including her on the list of ten "hot MILFs" in video games. Complex ranked Sophitia eight in their 2012 list of the "hottest" video game characters, calling her "essentially a female Leonidas, by which we mean a gladiator with massive cleavage. We'd take watching her over Kurt Russell any day." That same year, IGN Spain as the sixth sexiest woman in digital entertainment. In 2013, Scott Marley of Daily Record ranked her as the fourth-most attractive female video game character, while Steve Jenkins of CheatCodes.com declared her the "ninth-hottest video game girl" of all time. La Nueva España included her among the top ten sexiest video game characters of both genders for her "pneumatic curves" in 2014, noting her as the only mother on that list, and Thanh Niên ranked her as the ninth sexiest female game character in 2015.

References

Fantasy video game characters
Female characters in video games
Fictional bakers
Fictional Ottoman Greeks
Fictional characters from Athens
Fictional female martial artists
Fictional Greek people in video games
Fictional pagans
Fictional pankration practitioners
Fictional shield fighters
Fictional swordfighters in video games
Namco protagonists
Soulcalibur series characters
Video game characters introduced in 1995
Nobility characters in video games
Woman soldier and warrior characters in video games